Habtemariam is a surname. Notable people with the surname include:

Berhane Habtemariam, Eritrean politician
Ethiopia Habtemariam (born 1979), American businesswoman
Nebiat Habtemariam (born 1978), Eritrean long-distance runner

Surnames of African origin